The Best of Jethro Tull – The Anniversary Collection is a greatest hits album by Jethro Tull, released in 1993. It includes some of the band's biggest hits from 1968 to 1991.

Track listing

Disc 1 

 "A Song for Jeffrey" – 3:19
 "Beggar's Farm" – 4:19
 "A Christmas Song" – 3:07
 "A New Day Yesterday" – 4:09
 "Bourée" (Instrumental) – 3:46
 "Nothing Is Easy" – 4:23
 "Living in the Past" – 3:21
 "To Cry You a Song" – 6:15
 "Teacher" – 4:01
 "Sweet Dream" – 4:02
 "Cross-Eyed Mary" – 4:09
 "Mother Goose" – 3:53
 "Aqualung" – 6:36
 "Locomotive Breath" – 4:25
 "Life Is a Long Song" – 3:19
 "Thick as a Brick" (extract) – 3:02
 "A Passion Play" (extract) – 3:47 ("Magus Perdé")
 "Skating Away on the Thin Ice of the New Day" – 3:52
 "Bungle in the Jungle" – 3:39

Disc 2

 "Minstrel in the Gallery" (Edited version) – 6:10
 "Too Old to Rock 'n' Roll: Too Young to Die" – 5:40
 "Songs from the Wood" – 4:54
 "Jack-in-the-Green" – 2:30
 "The Whistler" – 3:32
 "Heavy Horses" – 8:57
 "Dun Ringill" – 2:41
 "Fylingdale Flyer" – 4:32
 "Jack-a-Lynn" – 4:42
 "Pussy Willow" – 3:53
 "Broadsword" – 4:59
 "Under Wraps II" – 2:14
 "Steel Monkey" – 3:34
 "Farm on the Freeway" – 6:28
 "Jump Start" – 4:53
 "Kissing Willie" – 3:31
 "This Is Not Love" – 3:54

Musicians

Disc 1
 Ian Anderson – flute, balalaika, mandolin, Hammond organ, acoustic guitar, vocals (all tracks)
 Mick Abrahams – electric guitar (tracks 1 – 2)
 Clive Bunker – drums, glockenspiel, percussion (tracks 1 – 14)
 Glenn Cornick – bass, Hammond organ (tracks 1 – 10)
 Martin Barre – electric guitar (tracks 4 – 19)
 Jeffrey Hammond-Hammond bass (tracks 11 – 19)
 Barriemore Barlow – drums (tracks 15 – 19)
 David Palmer – orchestral arrangement and conducting  (tracks 3, 10 a 17 – 19)

Disc 2
 Ian Anderson – flute, balalaika, Hammond organ, acoustic guitar, vocals (all tracks)
 Jeffrey Hammond-Hammond bass (track 1)
 Martin Barre –  electric guitar (tracks 1 – 17)
 Barriemore Barlow – drums (tracks 1 – 7)
 John Glascock bass, vocals (tracks 2 – 7)
 David Palmer – orchestral arrangement and conducting  (tracks 1 – 7)
 Dave Pegg – bass, mandolin, vocals (tracks 8 – 17)
 Mark Craney – drums (track 8)
 Gerry Conway – drums, percussion (tracks 9 – 11 and 15)
 Peter-John Vettese – keyboards, piano, synthesizer (tracks 9 – 12)
 Doane Perry – drums (tracks 12, 14 a 16 – 17)
 Maartin Allcock – keyboards (track 16)
 Andrew Giddings – keyboards (track 17)

Guest musicians
 Lou Toby – string arrangement, conducting (disc 1, track 7)
 Maddy Prior – backing vocals (disc 2, track 2)
 Darryl Way – violin (disc 2, track 6)
 Eddie Jobson – keyboards, electric violin, (disc 2, track 8)

References

Best of Jethro Tull - The Anniversary Collection, The
Best of Jethro Tull - The Anniversary Collection, The
Chrysalis Records compilation albums